The Sr2 is a class of electric locomotives of the VR Group. They were built by SLM/ABB and later by Adtranz and finally Bombardier Transportation and assembled by Transtech Oy. They are closely based on the class Re 460 (or Lok 2000) locomotives of Swiss Federal Railways.

The nicknames of this class are Alppiruusu (Edelweiss), Käkikello (Cuckoo clock), both referring to the Swiss origin of the locomotive, as well as Marsu (Guinea pig) and Möhkö (Blob), both from the looks of the locomotive.

History

In 1992, VR ordered the first 20 class Sr2 locomotives; later 20 more were ordered with 12 options. Finally only six of the 12 options were transformed into orders, forming a total fleet of 46 engines. The locomotives are used on both passenger trains and freight trains, and they are the primary locomotives of the fast InterCity trains in Finland.

Until mid-2010s Sr2s were pulling IC trains the classic way, but after Edo-class cab control cars were introduced in 2013, Sr2 units have been used in pull-push mode with IC double deck stock. Until introduction of new Sr3 locomotives, Sr2 has been the only electric locomotive equipped for push-pull among Finnish rolling stock.

Technical information 
When introduced, the Sr2 was the fastest and most powerful locomotive of the VR.

The locomotive has GTO-thyristor inverters driving three-phase asynchronous AC motors. The motors are small and fit entirely within the bogies. The bogies weigh only 15.8 tonnes and are equipped with radially steered axles. This reduces rail wear significantly.

The whole construction of the locomotive is modular and all functions are controlled by several microprocessors via the locomotive bus (MICAS S2). The system is redundant, so that a failure in one processor does not harm the overall system. The data lines are fiber optic cables.

Sr2 units are fitted with Unilink couplers, which combine a SA3 and a traditional chain coupler.

Design and livery 

As with all the Lok 2000 locomotives, the external design is by Pininfarina. The series were painted red and white, showcasing VR's InterCity colours, with a large V on the bodyside to symbolise VR's high-speed traffic. Starting from number 3222 the V was replaced with VR's logo. Beginning from 2010 and starting from engine number 3221, all units were repainted with VR's current colour scheme (green and white).

See also
VR Class Sr1
VR Class Sr3
SBB-CFF-FFS Re 460

References

Literature

External links
 
 Photos of the Sr2 at Vaunut.org 
 Sr2 profile at Trainspo

SLM locomotives
Brown, Boveri & Cie locomotives
Electric locomotives of Finland
Bo′Bo′ locomotives
Sr2
25 kV AC locomotives
Pininfarina
Railway locomotives introduced in 1995
5 ft gauge locomotives